The Jinnah Stadium, formerly known as Municipal Stadium, is a multipurpose stadium in Gujranwala, Punjab, Pakistan. It is used mostly for cricket matches. The stadium capacity is 20,000
 And hosted its first and only Test match in 1991. Record-breaking Indian batsman Sachin Tendulkar made his ODI cricket debut in 1989 at this ground. The last ODI match played there was between Pakistan and Sri Lanka in 2000 and was the first ODI match Aleem Dar umpired.

The Jinnah Stadium is the largest stadium in Gujranwala, followed by the Mini Stadium, an association of football which has a capacity of 15,000.

The creator of this stadium is Alhaj Muhammad Aslam Butt (former mayor of Gujranwala). The stadium designed by Amjad Saleem Tahir CEO Of Aeys Associates and is located on Sialkot road. Today,  it is mostly used for sports day of schools.

Cricket World Cup
This stadium hosted an ODI match in the 1996 Cricket World Cup between Pakistan and UAE.

One Day International centuries
The following table summarizes the One-Day International centuries scored at Jinnah Stadium, Gujranwala

Five-wicket Hauls in One Day internationals
Only 1 five wicket haul has been taken at Jinnah Stadium, Gujranwala

See also
List of Test cricket grounds
 List of stadiums in Pakistan
 List of cricket grounds in Pakistan
 One-Test wonder

References

Test cricket grounds in Pakistan
Multi-purpose stadiums in Pakistan
Cricket grounds in Pakistan
Sport in Gujranwala
1987 Cricket World Cup stadiums
1996 Cricket World Cup stadiums
Memorials to Muhammad Ali Jinnah